The Roman Catholic Diocese of Alto Valle del Río Negro (erected 22 July 1993) is in Argentina and is a suffragan of the Archdiocese of Bahía Blanca.

Ordinaries
José Pedro Pozzi, S.D.B. (1993–2003)
Néstor Hugo Navarro (2003–2010)
Marcelo Alejandro Cuenca (2010–2021)
Alejandro Pablo Benna (2021–present)

References

External links
 

Alto Valle del Rio Negro
Alto Valle del Rio Negro
Alto Valle Del Rio Negro
Alto Valle Del Rio Negro